Hussein Hawsawi (born 22 January 1998) is a Saudi Arabian professional footballer who plays as a defender for Jeddah.

Career

Al-Faisaly
Hawsawi started his career at Al-Faisaly and is a product of the Al-Faisaly's youth system. On 21 September 2018, Hawsawi made his professional debut for Al-Faisaly against Ohod in the Pro League .

Al-Taqadom (loan)
On 15 July 2019, left Al-Faisaly and signed with Al-Taqadom on loan to season.

Al-Jabalain
On 29 September, left Al-Faisaly and signed with Al-Jabalain.

Career statistics

Club

References

External links 
 
 

1998 births
Living people
Saudi Arabian footballers
Al-Faisaly FC players
Al-Taqadom FC players
Al-Jabalain FC players
Jeddah Club players
Saudi Professional League players
Saudi First Division League players
Association football defenders